Manoella Torres is an American singer and actress of Puerto Rican descent based in Mexico who has had an extensive career that continues to this day. She has recorded over 350 songs by famous songwriters including Armando Manzanero, Juan Carlos Calderón, Juan Gabriel, Manuel Alejandro and Rafael Pérez Botija.

Biography
Born as Gloria Torres Calderón, she was the daughter of Puerto Ricans Felicia Calderón and Jorge Torres. As a young girl she was sent to live with her maternal grandmother. She encouraged Gloria's talent while Gloria idolized singers like Cuco Sánchez, Los Panchos and Lucha Villa. In Mexico she continued to study vocalization and years later met the man who would take her career to the next level, Alfredo Marcelo Gil. He became her manager and initially gave her the stage name "Gloria Gil". She began making the rounds of musical events and television appearances where she met another important figure in her career, Armando Manzanero. Upon hearing her sing, he said "Niñita, tú naciste para cantar (Little girl, you were born to sing)". This quote would eventually become her media nickname "la mujer que nació para cantar (the woman who was born to sing)".

In 1971, she was offered a contract record deal with Columbia Records and her stage name was changed to "Manoella Torres". Her first album "Nació Para Cantar" included her first single record that Manzanero wrote titled "El Último Verano" became a smash hit throughout Mexico. Soon Manoella would amass hit after hit appearing regularly on "Siempre en Domingo" with Raúl Velasco. She appeared on numerous Mexican television variety shows and shared the stage with Mexico's most famous entertainers such as Verónica Castro and Gualberto Castro. Some of her greatest hits include "Ahora Que Soy Libre", "Te Voy A Enseñar A Querer", "Libre Como Gaviota", "Acaríciame", "Que Me Perdone Tu Señora", and quite possibly her most famous song "A La Que Vive Contigo", written by her mentor Armando Manzanero.

Towards the end of the 1970s, Manoella married Guillermo Diestel Pasquel, with whom she had a daughter, Erika. Later, it was discovered that he was abusive towards Manoella, resulting in her separation from her husband and in the mid-1980s she left Mexico. Disillusioned with love, she decided to focus on her life and her daughter. For three years, she had no contact with anyone of her previous life in Mexico. Deciding to end her marriage, and start anew, she returned to Mexico in 1988 and started performing.

In February 2007, Manoella Torres became part of Mexican television network TV Azteca's reality show titled "Disco de Oro", hosted by José Luis Rodríguez "El Puma", in which singers of the past compete in an interactive environment with the viewers.  The winner got to release an album produced by the network but, unfortunately, Manoella achieved the third place.

Today she continues to tour continuously across Mexico and to release albums regularly, most of the time consisting of covers of herself and other famous singers.

Discography

See also
List of Mexicans
List of Puerto Ricans

References

External links
Manoella Torres – Official Website (Spanish language official website)

1954 births
Living people
Singers from New York City
American people of Puerto Rican descent
American emigrants to Mexico
American women singers
American film actresses
Mexican film actresses
Mexican singers
Mexican television actresses
American television actresses
Hispanic and Latino American actresses
Hispanic and Latino American musicians
Hispanic and Latino American women singers
Mexican people of Puerto Rican descent